The 1969 All-Ireland Minor Football Championship was the 38th staging of the All-Ireland Minor Football Championship, the Gaelic Athletic Association's premier inter-county Gaelic football tournament for boys under the age of 18.

Cork entered the championship as defending champions.

On 28 September 1969, Cork won the championship following a 2-7 to 0-11 defeat of Derry in the All-Ireland final. This was their fourth All-Ireland title overall and their third in succession.

Results

Connacht Minor Football Championship

Quarter-final

Galway 1-11 Sligo 0-5.

Semi-finals

Mayo 2-14 Leitrim 2-4.

Galway 3-6 Roscommon 0-12 Pearse Stadium, Galway.

Final

Galway 3-3 Mayo 0-8 Castlebar.

Munster Minor Football Championship

Leinster Minor Football Championship

Ulster Minor Football Championship

All-Ireland Minor Football Championship

Semi-finals

Final

Championship statistics

Miscellaneous

 Cork achieve the double for the second time in their history, after earlier winning the All-Ireland Minor Hurling Championship. They also become the second team after Dublin in 1956 to win three successive All-Ireland titles. Brian Murphy and Ger Hanley claim winners' medals in both All-Ireland victories.

References

1969
All-Ireland Minor Football Championship